Bill Garner (born June 17, 1940) is an American retired basketball player.

Born in East St. Louis, Illinois, Garner played college basketball at the University of Portland. A 6'10" center, Garner was drafted by the Los Angeles Lakers in the eighth round (8th pick, 68th overall) of the 1962 NBA draft.

Following his college career, Garner played professionally for the Long Beach Chiefs of the American Basketball League until the league ceased operations after the 1962–63 season. From 1963 to 1966 Garner played for the Harlem Globetrotters. He later played for the Anaheim Amigos during the 1967–68 season in the American Basketball Association.

References

1940 births
Living people
American men's basketball players
Anaheim Amigos players
Basketball players from Illinois
Centers (basketball)
Long Beach Chiefs players
Los Angeles Lakers draft picks
Portland Pilots men's basketball players
Sportspeople from East St. Louis, Illinois